Indi Armstrong Cowie (born 24 September 1994) is a Scottish American professional freestyle footballer and football coach. She became an assistant coach to Anson Dorrance at the North Carolina Tar Heels when a knee injury caused her retirement from college soccer. Cowie had previously played as a midfielder or forward for Scottish Women's Premier League (SWPL) club Celtic and won three caps for the Scotland women's national under-17 football team.

Cowie was born in Florida to parents from the West of Scotland. She was inspired to take up freestyle football after observing a demonstration by John Farnworth. In 2012 male footballer Lionel Messi picked Cowie as the winner of a global freestyle football competition tied in with the FIFA Street video game. As of 2014, Cowie practices her skills for one to three hours per day. In 2015, Cowie became the first woman to do a three revolution - three full circles around the soccer ball with the foot while it is still in the air.

See also
 Freestylefootball
 World Freestyle Football Association

References

External links
 
 

1994 births
Living people
Scottish women's footballers
Celtic F.C. Women players
North Carolina Tar Heels women's soccer players
American women's soccer players
Soccer players from Florida
Freestyle footballers
Women's association football midfielders
Women's association football forwards
American people of Scottish descent